Edgefield Historic District is a national historic district located at Edgefield, Edgefield County, South Carolina.  The district encompasses 33 contributing buildings, 6 contributing sites, and 1 contributing object in the town of Edgefield.  The buildings center on the landscaped village green, and includes forty 19th century buildings, three of which are house museums. There are a number of 19th century Greek Revival style homes, while others are noted for beautiful Federal style fanlights and unusual doorways. Other district properties include Victorian influenced homes and downtown commercial buildings. Five churches represent the Georgian, Victorian Gothic, and modified Gothic architectural styles. Notable buildings include the Edgefield County Courthouse,	Trinity Episcopal Church and Rectory, St. Mary's Catholic Church (designed by John R. Niernsee), Halcyon Grove, Oakley Park, Carroll Hill, Blocker House, Yarborough House, and Padgett House.

It was listed on the National Register of Historic Places in 1972.

References

Historic districts on the National Register of Historic Places in South Carolina
Victorian architecture in South Carolina
Georgian architecture in South Carolina
Federal architecture in South Carolina
Greek Revival architecture in South Carolina
Gothic Revival architecture in South Carolina
Buildings and structures in Edgefield County, South Carolina
National Register of Historic Places in Edgefield County, South Carolina